The following is a list of notable events and releases of the year 1957 in Norwegian music.

Events

May
 The 5th Bergen International Festival started in Bergen, Norway.

Unknown date
 The Fana Folklore, an annual summer event, was initiated by Signy Eikeland.

Deaths

 November
 19 – Christian Leden, ethno-musicologist and composer (born 1882).

 September
 20 – Edvard Bræin, composer and orchestra conductor (born 1887).

Births

 January
 '8'' – Christian Eggen, composer, pianist and conductor.

 February
 11 – Oddmund Finnseth, jazz upright bassist, composer, and music teacher.
 13 – Inger Marie Gundersen, jazz singer and composer.

 March
 19 – Øystein Sevåg, classical and world music pianist and keyboardist.

 April
 6 – Terje Mikkelsen, composer.

 May
 22 Anne Grete Preus, singer, guitarist, and composer.
 Hege Schøyen, singer, actor and comedian.

 July
 12 – Fredrik Carl Størmer, jazz drummer and entrepreneur.
 17 – Njål Vindenes, classical guitarist.
 27 – Jørn Hoel, composer, guitarist and singer.

 September
 7 – Rolf Wallin, composer, trumpeter and avant-garde performance artist.
 28 – Ernst-Wiggo Sandbakk, jazz drummer and music teacher.

 October
 4 – Yngve Moe, bass guitarist for Dance with a Stranger (died 2013).
 7 – Morten Halle, jazz saxophonist, composer and music arranger.

 December
 14''' – Runar Tafjord, jazz French horn player.

See also
 1957 in Norway
 Music of Norway

References

 
Norwegian music
Norwegian
Music
1950s in Norwegian music